KIIT Science College is a fully residential, co-educational, junior college located in Bhubaneswar, Odisha. It is a constituent of KIIT Group of Institutions.

Courses offered 
The institute offers full-time +2 Science course as per the norms of Council of Higher Secondary Education, Odisha.

Compulsory subjects: English, MIL (Oriya/alternative English/Hindi/Sanskrit), Environmental Education.
Optional subjects: Physics, Chemistry, Biology, Mathematics, Electronics, IT, Computer Science, Statistics
Additional non-credit courses: Career Counseling, Computational Science

External links 
Official Home Page

Department of Higher Education, Odisha
Universities and colleges in Bhubaneswar
Science and technology in Bhubaneswar
Educational institutions in India with year of establishment missing